Springer on the Radio was an American radio program broadcast from WCKY and later WSAI in Cincinnati from January 17, 2005 to December 5, 2006 and syndicated nationally on the Air America Radio network from April 1, 2005 to September 18, 2006 when it moved to Air America syndication, meaning that it was still syndicated nationally, but not on the Air America network lineup. It was hosted by Jerry Springer, best known as a TV talk show host. Springer is a former Democratic politician (formerly Cincinnati’s mayor) still active in the party organization. His radio show focused on the day's news with a liberal and progressive standpoint.  It aired on weekdays from 9:00 a.m. to 12:00 p.m. ET on select Air America radio stations.  The theme on all Friday shows was called Freedom Fridays, allowing callers to talk about whatever topic they desired.  On the other days of the week, callers were only allowed to comment on what Springer was discussing.

Political aspects
Jerry Springer gained national popularity in the early 1990s hosting The Jerry Springer Show, setting the standard of so-called 'Trash TV'. Springer on the Radio is produced with a higher quality level compared to The Jerry Springer Show. The program's comments and general standpoint overwhelmingly favors the Democratic Party and viewpoints considered liberal in the American political spectrum.

Springer on the Radio, along with other talk shows broadcast on the Air America Radio network, arose to counterattack the perceived radio hegemony of conservative talk show hosts such as Rush Limbaugh and Sean Hannity. Over the years, Jerry Springer has shown an interest in running for either the United States Senate or the governorship in Ohio. His decision to host a serious liberal radio show might be due to a desire to distance himself from his TV show, which he himself considered ‘stupid’. Such action gives Springer the possibility to prove to the older generations that, while his TV show (which appeals primarily to younger adults) was empty-minded, he may nevertheless be well-suited to representing citizens.

Stations
Terrestrial

Springer on the Radio reached a height of 53 affiliates.  It did not have nearly as many when the show reached its last day on air.  USA Today reported that the show had  "about two dozen" stations on its last day.  Some of these stations are listed below.

San Diego, CA: 1360 KLSD
San Luis Obispo, CA: 1340 KYNS
Santa Barbara, CA: 1340 KCLU
Detroit, MI: 1310 WDTW (AM)
Sarasota, FL: 1450 WSRQ
Chicago, IL: 850 WCPT (AM)
Portland, ME: 870 WMTW (AM)
Ann Arbor, MI: 1290 WLBY
New York, NY: 1600 WWRL
Santa Fe, NM: 1260 KTRC
Cincinnati, OH: 1360 WSAI
Memphis, TN: 680 WWTQ
Austin, TX: 1600 KOKE
Corpus Christi, TX: 1150 KCCT
El Paso, TX: 1650 KHRO
Brattleboro, VT: 1490 WKVT
Burlington, VT: 1070 WTWK

Satellite/Other
XM Radio: Channel 167; Springer on the Radio was taken off XM Radio after it was moved to Air America Syndication
Online at www.airamericaradio.com

External links
SpringerOnTheRadio.com
Air America Radio main page

American talk radio programs
Air America (radio network)